The Federal Center for Technological Education of Minas Gerais (CEFET-MG) is an education center located in the Brazilian state of Minas Gerais.

It is a technological institution that offers a broad range of courses in the State of Minas Gerais, in the southeast of Brazil. With approximately 15,000 students, 650 professors and 400 staff members, the institution carries out teaching associated with research and communitarian extension in the secondary and higher education levels.

Campuses I, II and VI are located in Amazonas Avenue in Belo Horizonte. The other campuses (Decentralized Education Units - UNEDs) located within the state of Minas Gerais, the cities of Leopoldina, Araxá, Divinópolis, Varginha, Timóteo, Nepomuceno, Curvelo and Contagem.

Courses

Secondary level
CEFET-MG offers secondary (high-school) level education at all campuses. High-school students at CEFET-MG also graduate with a degree from one of the many professional and technological courses offered by the institution. Students are admitted through admission exams held at the end of each calendar year.

Professional and Technological education
CEFET-MG offers professional and technological courses in three ways:
Integrated: for students who have not yet graduated from high-school and wish to do so at CEFET-MG;
External: for students currently enrolled at other secondary schools;
Subsequent: for people who already have a high-school degree.
Students are admitted through admission exams held on a semestrial basis, except for the integrated courses.

The courses (some offered only in certain campuses) are:
Biomedical Equipment
Chemistry
Computer Networks
Computing
Construction
Electromechanics
Electronics
Electrotechnology
Environmental Control
Environmental Studies
Fashion Design
Highways
Hospitality
Mechanics
Mechatronics
Metallurgy
Mining
Transit

Undergraduate courses
CEFET-MG's undergraduate courses are offered in most campuses, most notably Campus I and Campus II. Students are admitted through ENEM, a nationwide high-school-level examination which takes place towards the end of each calendar year. Admitted students are then sorted into two groups according to their ENEM score, one starting late February/early March of the following year (1st semester students) and the other in August (2nd semester students).

CEFET-MG offers the following undergraduate courses:

Bachelor's degrees
Business
Portuguese
Civil Engineering
Civil Production Engineering
Computer Engineering
Control and Automation Engineering
Electrical Engineering
Environmental and Sanitary Engineering
Industrial Automation Engineering
Materials Engineering
Mechanical Engineering
Mechatronic Engineering
Mining Engineering
Transportation Engineering
Technological Chemistry (Industrial Chemistry & Chemical Engineering)

Technological degrees
Pedagogy

Graduate courses
CEFET-MG offers master's and doctoral degrees as well.

Master's degrees
Business
Chemistry
Civil Engineering
Electrical Engineering
Mining Engineering
Energy Engineering
Language Studies
Materials Engineering
Technological Education
Mathematical and Computational Modeling

Doctoral degrees
Language Studies
Mathematical and Computational Modeling
Civil Engineering

Research
CEFET-MG supports around 40 research groups, most of them receiving governmental grants to carry on their research. To fulfill this, CEFET-MG has celebrated cooperation agreements with a meaningful number of high level Brazilian higher education institutions and universities in France, Germany, Hungary, Portugal, among others – Australia, Italy and Spain are in prospection at the moment.

See also
CEFET

References

External links
 Official page

Technical universities and colleges in Brazil
Universities and colleges in Minas Gerais
Minas Gerais